Heldmann is a German surname. Notable people with the surname include:

Alois Heldmann (1895–1983), German World War I flying ace
Carl Heldmann (born 1942), American writer
Marcel Heldmann (born 1966), Swiss footballer

See also
Heldman

German-language surnames